Chris Fry may refer to:

 Chris Fry (musician), musician in the Welsh band Magenta
 Chris Fry (footballer) (born 1969), Welsh former footballer